The ZFB-05 Xinxing is a Chinese armored personnel carrier developed mainly for the People's Liberation Army Ground Force, the People's armed Police, police forces, Chinese UN peacekeepers, and the export market. It is a simple and low-cost vehicle. The ZFB-05 has a all-steel armored hull, making it marginally effective against small arms fire and artillery shrapnel.

Design 
The ZFB-05 is designed and manufactured by the Shaanxi Baoji Special Vehicles Co., Ltd, a private vehicle company established in 1983 as the Baoji Special Vehicles Factory, then privatized in 2007. Historically, most Chinese military equipment are produced by state-owned enterprises, but due to the strategy of Military-Civil Fusion, many private and civilian enterprises are able to enter the military market, producing weaponry and equipment for the People's Liberation Army.

The vehicle is based on the chassis of the Nanjing NJ2046 light utility vehicle, which a licensed copy of the Iveco 40.10WM. It features an all-steel armored hull which is, according to the official website, effective against 7.62*39mm standard ammunition fired from a Type 81 light machine gun in close range. Additional applique armor is also available, as well as an optional NBC protection system, however, an incident in which Chinese peacekeepers on a ZFB-05 being attacked in Haiti demonstrated that the armor of the vehicle is not resistant to armor-piercing bullets and therefore not suitable to high-intensity combat environments. 

The main armament of the ZFB-05 is a 12.7mm heavy machine gun mounted in a turret on the roof of the vehicle, with a shield to provide frontal protection to the gunner. Some vehicles are observed with other armaments such as a 7.62mm machine gun, a 23mm autocannon, or a 35mm automatic grenade launcher. The vehicle is powered by a SOFIM 8142.43 4-cylinder turbocharged diesel engine, which produces an output of 117hp; another available engine is the SOFIM 8142.45, which produces approximately 127hp.

Variants

ZFB-05A 
A more advanced version of the ZFB-05 with slightly improved frontal protection (frontal armor can withstand Type 53 7.62*39mm armor piercing ammunition), it also has a higher maximum speed of 115km/h.

ZFB-05C Armored ambulance 
The ZFB-05C is the medical variant of the ZFB-05, with improved armor allowing protection from 7.62*39mm steel-core ammunition in all directions, the ZFB-05C can transport 3 sitting patients or 1 lying down, the ZFB-05C-1 is a slightly larger vehicle with the capacity of 5 sitting patients or 2 lying down.

ZFB-05 Broadcasting vehicle 
The broadcasting vehicle is a ZFB-05 with two loud speakers along with a variety of other broadcasting equipment on a rotational mount in place of the weapon station.

ZFB-05 Riot control vehicle 
This is a baseline ZFB-05 equipped with two water cannons.

ZFB-05 Police vehicle 
The ZFB-05 police variant is used by Chinese regional police forces.

ZFB-08 
The ZFB-08 is a 6*6 version of the ZFB-05 with more focus on protection from mines and under-body blasts.

TD-2000 Short range surface-to-air missile system 
The TD-2000 short range surface-to-air missile system (contains 8 QW-4 missiles) can be mounted on the ZFB-05 along with a variety of other light utility vehicles such as the Dongfeng Mengshi.

Users 
  : 2 delivered in 2010
  : 41 delivered in 2016 and 2018
  : 10 delivered in 2007
  : 100 in service in 2008
  : 5 delivered from 2006 to 2009
  : 3 delivered in 2006
  : 10 delivered in 2011
  : 5 delivered in 2009
  : 20 delivered in 2008

External links
 Official page

References

Armoured personnel carriers